Matthew Lee or variants may refer to:

 Matthew Lee (lawyer), Chinese-American public interest lawyer
 Matthew Lee (sociologist), American sociologist
 Gammer (born 1985), real name Matthew Lee, British DJ and producer
 Matty Lee (born 1998), British diver
 Matt Lee (dancer), Australian dancer and actor
 Matt Lee (journalist), Associated Press reporter
 Matt Lee (wrestler) (born 1983), Canadian professional wrestler